Chinatown is a neighborhood in Downtown Los Angeles, California, that became a commercial center for Chinese and other Asian businesses in Central Los Angeles in 1938. The area includes restaurants, shops, and art galleries, but also has a residential neighborhood with a low-income, aging population of about 20,000 residents.

The original Los Angeles Chinatown developed in the late 19th century, but it was demolished to make room for Union Station, the city's major ground-transportation center. A separate commercial center, known as "New Chinatown," opened for business in 1938.

Geography and climate
According to CRA/LA, borders of (the current) Chinatown neighborhood are:
on the north: Stadium Way and Dodger Stadium/Chavez Ravine, which the L.A. Times includes as part of the Elysian Park neighborhood;
in addition, there is a northern sliver along North Broadway between Radio Hill Gardens on the northwest and Los Angeles State Historic Park on the southeast
 to the west and northwest, Beaudry and Figueroa streets and the greater Echo Park neighborhood
 on the east, 
 according to CRA/LA: North Main Street, Los Angeles State Historic Park and industrial areas along the west bank of the Los Angeles River
 according to the L.A. Times: the Los Angeles River and Lincoln Heights neighborhood
 on the south, Cesar Chavez Avenue and the Civic Center and Los Angeles Plaza historic districts of Downtown Los Angeles

History

Chinatown can refer to one of three locations near downtown Los Angeles. What is now known as Old Chinatown refers to the original location on Alameda and Macy (1880s–1933). Old Chinatown was displaced by the construction of Union Station, and two competing Chinatowns were built in the late 1930s north of Old Chinatown to replace it: China City (1938–1948) and New Chinatown (1938–present). China City was rebuilt just one year after opening due to a suspicious fire, but another fire in 1948 put it out of business for good.

Old Chinatown

China City

Christine Sterling, who worked on the conversion of a neglected street into the Mexican-themed Olvera Street, conceived of a similar plan for the displaced Chinese American population. On June 6, 1938, she opened China City, a walled enclave bounded by Main, Ord, Spring, and Macy (now Cesar Chavez), featuring Chinese-style architecture, restaurants, shops, rickshaw rides, a lotus pond, and a temple. Costumed workers greeted tourists, and a Chinese opera troupe performed live shows in front of the shops.

Some replica buildings in China City came from the set of the 1937 Hollywood blockbuster, The Good Earth. A dragon decoration was salvaged from the Los Angeles Times building. The architect was William Tuntke, and construction was supervised by Tom Kemp, from Paramount Studios. Gilbert Leong, who later was a prominent local architect, sculpted the statue of Kwan Yin that was set in a fountain for China City. 

China City received mixed support from Chinese American residents and businessmen. Many welcomed the economic opportunity the project provided. Others preferred the New Chinatown project, considered less distorted by the stereotyping lens of Hollywood. During its eleven-year existence, China City was destroyed by fire and rebuilt numerous times. In 1949, an act of arson destroyed China City, and the remainder was razed in 1955.

Little Italy
The neighborhood that has become Chinatown was formerly Sonoratown and then Little Italy. In the early 20th century, Italian immigrants settled in the area north of the Old Plaza. Many built businesses, including wineries (San Antonio Winery is still in existence). The Italian American Museum of Los Angeles in the El Pueblo de Los Ángeles Historical Monument opened in 2016.

New Chinatown

In the 1930s, under the efforts of Chinese-American community leader Peter Soo Hoo Sr., the design and operational concepts for a New Chinatown evolved through a collective community process, resulting in a blend of Chinese and American architecture. The Los Angeles Chinatown saw major development, especially as a tourist attraction, throughout the 1930s, with the development of the "Central Plaza," a Hollywoodized version of Shanghai, containing names such as Bamboo Lane, Gin Ling Way and Chung King Road (named after the city of Chongqing in mainland China). Chinatown was designed by Hollywood film set designers, and a "Chinese" movie prop was subsequently donated by film director Cecil B. DeMille to give Chinatown an exotic atmosphere.

The Hop Sing Tong Society is situated in Central Plaza, as are several other Chinatown lodges and guilds. Near Broadway, Central Plaza contains a statue honoring Dr. Sun Yat-sen, the Chinese revolutionary leader who is considered the "founder of modern China".  It was erected in the 1960s by the Chinese Consolidated Benevolent Association.  A 7-foot tall statue of martial artist Bruce Lee was unveiled at Central Plaza on June 15, 2013.

During the 1980s, many buildings were constructed for new shopping centers and mini-malls, especially along Broadway. Metro Plaza Hotel was opened in the southwest corner of Chinatown in the early 1990s.  A large Chinese gateway is found at the intersection of Broadway and Cesar Chavez Avenue, funded by the local Teochew-speaking population.

New Chinatown is served by the L Line of the city's Metro Rail; parts of Old Chinatown were uncovered during excavation for another portion of the L.A. subway (the Red Line connection to Union Station). The Metro Rail station in Chinatown has been described as a spectacular pagoda-themed facility and as a cliché of neo-pagoda architecture by Christopher Hawthorne, the Los Angeles Times architecture critic.

In 1996, Academy Award-winning (for The Killing Fields in 1985)  Cambodian refugee, physician and actor, Haing S. Ngor, was killed in the Chinatown residential area in a bungled robbery attempt by members of an Asian gang. It had been speculated that he was assassinated for his activism against the Khmer Rouge government of Cambodia, but this idea was later proved unfounded.

By 2000 many people had left the Chinatown for the City of Monterey Park, which is a part of the larger Chinese community in the San Gabriel Valley. In 2000 AsianWeek said that the Los Angeles Chinatown was "troubled."

On June 28, 2008, a celebration of the 1938 founding of New Chinatown was held with the L.A. Chinatown 70th Anniversary Party. "Though lacking the hustle and bustle of San Francisco's Chinatown, Los Angeles' version has charms of its own."

Revitalization with new development
The 2010s and 2020s have seen the completion of several large mixed-use and multifamily residential buildings like other neighborhoods in and around Downtown Los Angeles. Activists and city council members were concerned about rising rents and displacement of long time residents, many of them low-income as these revitalization projects were approved. City officials and housing activists have debated how much affordable housing should be included amidst the market rate apartments and condominiums. Since 2019, the neighborhood has lacked a centrally located grocery store with a large selection, affordable prices and consistently high quality that opens early and closes late.

Demographics
The 2010 U.S. census counted 20,913 residents in the 0.91-square-mile Chinatown neighborhood, excluding the population of the Los Angeles County Jail complex. That made an average of 9,650 people per square mile, which included the empty Cornfield area.

The ethnic breakdown in 2010: Asian,  68.8%; Latino, 14.7%; blacks, 6.7%; whites, 8.7%; mixed race, 0.8%; and others, 2.3%.

The median household income in 2010 dollars ($29,000), was the third-lowest in Los Angeles County, preceded by Watts ($28,200) and Downtown ($24,300). The percentage of households earning $20,000 or less (53.6%) was the third-largest in Los Angeles County, preceded by Downtown (57.4%) and University Park (56.6%). The average household size of 2.8 people was just about the city norm. Renters occupied 91% of the housing units, and home- or apartment owners the rest.

Education

Just 11.7% of Chinatown residents aged 25 and older possessed a four-year degree in 2010, the sixth-least in Los Angeles County. There are three schools operating within Chinatown. They are:
 Endeavor College Preparatory Charter School, middle, 126 Bloom Street
 Castelar Street Elementary School, LAUSD, 840 Yale Street
 Cathedral High School, a private Catholic boys' school, just down the hill from Dodger Stadium, is located on the north side of Chinatown. 
 Evans Community Adult School - largest stand-alone ESL adult school in the nation
Los Angeles Public Library operates the Chinatown Branch.

Businesses

Retail
Small, specialized grocery stores are important to the aging population but few remain as gentrification impacts the neighborhood. The Chinese-Vietnamese residents own many bazaars. The stores sell products such as soap, toys, clothes, music CDs at low prices. Several restaurants in Chinatown serve mainly Cantonese cuisine but there are also various Asian cuisine restaurants such as Teochew Chinese, Vietnamese, Indonesian, and Thai, which reflects the diverse character of Chinatown. Few boba cafes have opened in Chinatown, but a large number are to be found in the Chinese enclaves in the San Gabriel Valley.

TS Emporium and Tin Bo are stores selling ginseng and herbs as well as other household merchandises are operated within the confinement of this particular Chinatown.

Dynasty Center, Saigon Plaza, and the Chinatown Phuoc Loc Tho Center feature many Vietnamese-style bazaars with people engaged in bargain shopping for items such as clothing, toys, Chinese-language CDs, pets, household items, funerary products, and so on. Its entrepreneurs are ethnic Chinese from Vietnam.

There are over 20 art galleries to see, mostly featuring non-Chinese modern art, with works from up and coming artists in all types of media. Popular galleries include Acuna-Hansen Gallery, Black Dragon Society, China Art Objects, Jancar Gallery and The Gallery at General Lee's. Spaces such as Telic Art Exchange, Betalevel and The Mountain Bar often have readings, performances and lectures.

Restaurants

Chinatown is in the process of becoming an entirely new place. Chinatown at the height of popularity was filled with bustling Chinese restaurants that included barbecue delicatessens with glass displays of roast duck and suckling pig and Cantonese seafood restaurants with dim sum. As the action in Chinese cuisine became centered in the San Gabriel Valley, southeast Asian eating places filled some of the empty spaces and offered Vietnamese pho noodle soup and submarine sandwiches called banh mi. As downtown revives, Chinatown has been sparked into life by cheap rents, the gallery boom in the 2000s and deep-rooted sense of community. Chinese bakeries and other shops continue to serve the area. Traditional Chinese restaurants that have remained are being joined by a variety of new restaurants as the opportunities Chinatown offers is recognized by additional restaurateurs. The area is better served by transit than many areas with Union Station so close by. Even though low-income seniors remain, college graduates can find their first apartment here and condos are becoming available for the affluent. This economic diversity encourages a diversity of places to serve the area.

Two of Chinatown's restaurants highlight the history and diversity of this neighborhood.
 Philippe's has been located on the corner of Alameda Street, at the edge of Chinatown, in the Historical District of Los Angeles since 1951, and is known as one of the creators of the French Dip sandwich.
 Little Joe's, demolished in January 2014, had long stood at the corner of Broadway and College Street. It closed in December 1998 due to the expense of retrofitting the building to meet earthquake standards. The interior was left unchanged and it has been used as a filming location.

Recreation and parks
 Los Angeles State Historic Park, also known as the Cornfield, consists of a long open space between Spring Street and the tracks of the Metro L Line.
 Alpine Recreation Center, at 817 Yale Street, has a combined and multipurpose room with a capacity of 250. Two indoor gymnasiums have capacities of 450 each. There are also basketball courts (lighted/indoor/outdoor), a children's play area and volleyball courts (lighted).

Nomenclature

Events

Events that have been held or are planned in Los Angeles's Chinatown include:

• Chinese New Year Parade

• Lantern festival at the Chinese American Museum

• The Firecracker Run and Fun Walk

• Mid-autumn Moon Festival

• Miss Los Angeles Chinatown Pageant

A midnight firecracker display occurs every Chinese New Year's Eve at Thien Hau Temple and Xuan Wu San Buddhist Association.

Filming

Chinatown has served as the setting for many Hollywood films. The conclusion of the film Chinatown was filmed on Spring Street.  The movie Rush Hour was filmed on location in Chinatown. It is said that a stroll down Old Chinatown Plaza has many rewards, including recognizing many other locations that are used in filmmaking and television production.

 Feature films
 Chinatown
 Rush Hour
 I Love You, Man
 Gangster Squad
 Lethal Weapon 4
 Beverly Hills Ninja
 Strange Days
 Hard to Kill
 Balls of Fury
 15 Minutes

Notable people
 Cayetano Apablasa (1847–1889), 19th Century property owner
 Helen Liu Fong (1927-2009), architect
 You Chung Hong (1898–1977), attorney, community leader
 Milton Quon, animator, artist and actor
 Bruce Lee (Chinese: 李小龍) (1940 – 1973), actor, whose statue is located at Central Plaza
 Haing S. Ngor (Chinese: 吳漢潤) (1940–1996), actor
 Yiu Hai Seto Quon (1899–1999), "Mama Quon," chef at Quon Bros. Grand Star Restaurant
 Lisa See, author
 Otto G. Weyse (ca. 1858–1893), liquor and wine dealer, member of the Los Angeles Common Council
 Tyrus Wong (1910–2016), artist
 Wilbur Woo (1915-2012), businessman and leader in the Chinese-American community

See also

 Thien Hau Temple (天后宮) located in Los Angeles's Chinatown
 Chinese American Museum
 Chinese Historical Society of Southern California
 List of Chinatowns
 List of districts and neighborhoods of Los Angeles
 Sonoratown, Los Angeles
 Chinese massacre of 1871

References

Sources
 American Chinatown: A People's History of Five Neighborhoods, Bonnie Tsui, 2009  .
 Ki Longfellow, China Blues, Eio Books 2012, . Contains detailed history of Chinese immigration to California and other historical information relating to Chinatown.  Also, how the Chinese were treated in California.

External links

 Los Angeles Chinese American Museum
 Los Angeles Chinatown Firecracker Run
 Chinese Historical Society of Southern California (Los Angeles Chinatown)
 Chinese Chamber of Commerce of Los Angeles
 Los Angeles Chinatown Business Council Official Website
 KCET Departures interview with Munson Kwok Chinatown community leader
 Chinatown crime map and statistics
 Pictures of Chinatown in 1911, from the UC Berkeley Bancroft Library

 
Little Italys in the United States
Italian-American culture in Los Angeles